UAAP Season 62 is the 1999–2000 athletic year of the University Athletic Association of the Philippines which was hosted by the University of the Philippines. The season opened on July 10, 1999, at the PhilSports Arena.

It was the last broadcast by Silverstar Sports aired on PTV. Jimmy Javier, Joaqui Trillo and Jude Turcuato were on hand for the last broadcast of the UAAP games.

Basketball

Men's tournament
The 62nd UAAP men's basketball tournament was held at the PhilSports Arena and Cuneta Astrodome from July 10 to October 9, 1999.

Elimination round

Playoffs
*Overtime

Overall championship race

Juniors' division

Seniors' division

Broadcast notes
 On July 10, 1991, the UAAP launched its season with live television coverage on Channel 9 by Kierulf's Silverstar Communications.The Silverstar coverage became the launch pad for the careers of the likes of Sev Sarmenta, Jude Turcuato, Anthony Suntay, Luigi Trillo, Ria Tanjuatco, Ella Aldeguer, former Ateneo star Danny Francisco, and the late Danny Romero who joined Joaqui Trillo and Javier in the broadcast team.

The UAAP games were 10th and final broadcast by Silverstar Sports including Jimmy Javier, Joaqui Trillo, Jude Turcuato, Ella Aldeguer (sister of Dino, who played for De La Salle Green Archers) and others were covered. After broadcast on PTV, to contract signing the new league coverage on Studio 23 has been produced by ABS-CBN Sports.

See also
NCAA Season 75

References

External links
PinoyExchange Forums

 
62
1999 in multi-sport events
1999 in Philippine sport